Russotto is a surname. Notable people with the surname include:

Andrea Russotto (born 1988), Italian footballer
Mario Russotto (born 1957), Italian Roman Catholic bishop

Italian-language surnames